Racoons are an indie rock band from Victoria, British Columbia.

History
Racoons were formed in 2008 by founding members Matthew Lyall and Murray Mckenzie. The duo were then joined by Jeff Mitchelmore and James Alexander Bodman, former members of indie pop band The Paper Cranes. The band's debut EP Islomania was released internationally through Maple Music in May 2009. In June 2009 the band embarked on a national tour with The Von Bondies across Canada as well as playing the Rifflandia, Sled Island, Olio, Deraylor and Big Time Out festivals. Over the summer of 2009 the band relocated to Vancouver where they are currently working on their debut full-length. The band are co-managed by Nick Blasko (Tegan and Sara, Buck 65) and Coral Osborne (The Blue Violets).

Band members
 Matthew Lyall – Vocals, Guitar
 Murray Mckenzie – Guitar, Keyboards
 Jeffrey Mitchelmore – Percussion
 Douglas Hamilton-Evans – Trumpet

Discography

Albums

 Islomania (2009) – Available on Maple Music

Singles

 Be My Television (Islomania 2009)
 Tangiers (Islomania 2009)

Awards
 Most Promising Band 2009 (won) Monday Magazine
 Best New Artist 2009 (currently nominated) CBC Radio 3
 Band of the Month January 2009 (won) The Zone
 Favourite Album of 2009 (runner-up) Monday Magazine
 Favourite Band 2010 (won) Monday Magazine

Radio and television
In September 2009, the song Room To Operate was featured in an episode of The Hills.

Singles Be My Television and Tangiers have received extensive national radio play on CBC Radio 3.

Racoons' performance at Rifflandia/Transmission on 24 September 2009, was broadcast live on Sirius Satellite Radio.

In February 2010, the song "Be My Television" was featured in an episode of 16 and Pregnant.

References
Citations

External links
 The Racoons Official Website
 The Racoons at Myspace
 The Racoons at MapleMusic Recordings

Musical groups established in 2008
Musical groups from Victoria, British Columbia
Canadian indie rock groups
2008 establishments in British Columbia